Saman Ban (also Romanized as Saman Bān and Samanbān; also known as Saman Band and Saman Baneh) is a village in Kivanat Rural District, Kolyai District, Sonqor County, Kermanshah Province, Iran. At the 2006 census, its population was 279, in 68 families.

References 

Populated places in Sonqor County